Goodenia scaevolina is a species of flowering plant in the family Goodeniaceae and is endemic to the north-west of Australia. It a perennial subshrub with egg-shaped to lance-shaped leaves, the narrower end towards the base, and thyrses of blue flowers.

Description

Taxonomy and naming
Goodenia scaevolina was first formally described in 1859 by Ferdinand von Mueller in Fragmenta phytographiae Australiae from material collected in 1856. The specific epithet (scaevolina) means Scaevola-like.

Distribution
This goodenia grows in scrub in shallow, stony soil in the Kimberley region of Western Australia and the north-west of the Northern Territory.

Conservation status
Goodenia scaevolina is classified as "not threatened" by the Government of Western Australia Department of Parks and Wildlife and of "least concern" under the Northern Territory Government Territory Parks and Wildlife Conservation Act 1976.

References

scaevolina
Eudicots of Western Australia
Plants described in 1859
Taxa named by Ferdinand von Mueller